Golukha is a rural locality (a settlement) and the administrative center of Golukhinsky Selsoviet of Zarinsky District, Altai Krai, Russia. The population was 1660 as of 2016. There are 18 streets.

Geography 
Golukha is located 54 km northeast of Zarinsk (the district's administrative centre) by road.  is the nearest rural locality. Mironovka is the nearest rural locality.

References 

Rural localities in Zarinsky District